Transformers: War's End is an American comic book limited series published by IDW Publishing. Based upon the Transformers franchise by Hasbro and Takara-Tomy, the series is set in the same continuity as the 2019 mainline comic book, set parallelly during the events of issues #40–43.

The series debuted on February 23, 2022 and concluded on May 25, 2022.

Premise 
A long time ago, Exarchon, a once peaceful and respected Transformer, somehow became a warlord and started his war against Cybertron through his faction, the Threefold Spark. Sometime later, during the conflict between the Autobots and the Decepticons, Exarchon reunites with his former generals, Skywarp and Shockwave, to finish what they started.

Publication history

Background 
Transformers was first announced by IDW Publishing on December 18, 2018. The title is written by Brian Ruckley, and was initially illustrated by Angel Hernandez and Cachét Whitman, and started publishing issues twice-monthly in March 2019. Ruckley described the writing opportunity as a "privilege", and stated that the title would be a great opportunity for new readers to familiarize themselves with the universe and characters of the Transformers franchise, which he describes as of the "biggest [and] best that science fiction has to offer".

Development 
In November 2021, IDW Publishing announced Transformers: War's End, a limited series written by Brian Ruckley (writer of Transformers and Transformers: Escape) and drawn by Jack Lawrence (artist of Transformers: Lost Light and Wreckers: Tread & Circuits), and was set to be released in February 2022.

Ruckley said "War's End is about unfinished business: for both the characters and for Cybertron as a whole. It's the return of Cybertron's traumatic past to upend its present... and answers the question: If your planet has at its core the collective Spark of your entire civilization, just how vulnerable might that make you?"

Lawrence said "Up to now, my Transformers work has been post- or pre-war, so with War's End, I'm excited to contribute to the Cybertronian war itself. This story is, understandably, darker and grittier than what I've worked on before, so I'm looking forward to going shadowy and ominous with it."

David Mariotte (editor in IDW and writer of Wreckers: Tread & Circuits) said “Since launching in 2019, all our Transformers universe titles — the ongoing, Galaxies, Escape, Wreckers: Tread & Circuits, the 2021 Annual, the Valentine’s Special, and the Halloween Special — have been the quilted pieces of an epic story, helmed by Brian Ruckley. War’s End and the ongoing series are where those threads weave together, showing the full picture of the Transformers mythos — past, present, and future — that we’ve been building for years.”

Issues

Reception

Collected edition

References

Notes

Footnotes 

IDW Publishing titles
2022 comics debuts
War's End